Ryan Ken is an American writer, actor, and comedian. They are best known for their sketch comedy videos posted to Instagram, TikTok, and Twitter. Ken's work has been recognized by Vulture, The Hollywood Reporter, NPR, and the Los Angeles Times. They are a staff writer for Last Week Tonight.

Early life and education 
Ken was born and raised in South Carolina. They performed in their first theatrical production in elementary school. Although Ken enjoyed the experience, they instead chose to focus on training as a violinist.

They received their master's degree in arts administration from the Art Institute of Chicago.

Career 
Ken gained prominence in 2020 for their sketch comedy videos that they created as an outlet for anxiety resulting from the COVID-19 pandemic. Shared to Twitter, Instagram, and TikTok, many of the videos satirize current events or pop culture with commentary on sociopolitical topics like race, gender, and sexuality. Past videos have included a scenario about the lunch break on the set of a movie about slavery, a neighbor listening to the titular characters argue in Malcolm & Marie, "73 Questions with Mitch McConnell" in the style of the Vogue videos, and an actor auditioning to play the gay friend in a 90s sitcom. Malcolm Venable of Shondaland.com described the videos as "less about jokes and more about blowing up the toxic codes we’ve ignored or endured without interrogating them."

They gained wider notoriety after Tina Knowles reposted their Malcolm & Marie parody video on Instagram. In 2021 Ken's work was recognized by outlets including Vulture, The Hollywood Reporter, Los Angeles Times, and Linda Holmes of NPR.

Ken co-hosts the podcast Let Me Back Up with Jennie Crichlow.

In 2022 they joined the writing staff of Last Week Tonight with John Oliver.

Personal life 
Ken is non-binary and uses they/them pronouns. They are queer.

Awards and nominations

References

External links 
 Official Twitter
 

Year of birth missing (living people)
Living people
21st-century American actors
African-American actors
African-American writers
American sketch comedians
Entertainers from South Carolina
American gay writers
American gay actors
Non-binary comedians
School of the Art Institute of Chicago alumni
Writers from South Carolina
American non-binary actors
LGBT people from South Carolina
American LGBT comedians
American non-binary writers